Fugløya is an island in Albert I Land at Spitsbergen,  Svalbard. It has a size of about 2.5 square kilometers, and is located off the peninsula Vasahalvøya, in the mouth of Fuglefjorden, and divides the fjord into two branches.

References

Islands of Svalbard